Tobias Fink (born 11 December 1983 in Hirschau) is a retired German footballer. He is the younger brother of fellow footballer Oliver Fink.

He made his debut on the professional league level when he started for FC Ingolstadt 04 in the 2. Bundesliga game against SpVgg Greuther Fürth on 17 August 2008. After his retirement from professional football, he still plays low class amateur football for FV Vilseck.

References

External links
 

1983 births
Living people
German footballers
SSV Jahn Regensburg players
SV Wacker Burghausen players
FC Ingolstadt 04 players
SC Fortuna Köln players
2. Bundesliga players
3. Liga players
Regionalliga players
Association football defenders